Bells of Coronado is a 1950 American Trucolor Western film directed by William Witney starring Roy Rogers, Trigger the horse, and Dale Evans.

Plot
The mine owner of the El Coronado Mime is ambushed on the road into town by thieves, who steal a wagon full of uranium ore. The owner is found by linemen of the Coronado Light & Power Company, but dies at the town's doctor's office before regaining consciousness.

The insurance company who has insured the ore, hires Roy to find out whether the wagon accidentally went off the road and if the ore fell into the Coronado Dam reservoir. Roy goes undercover. With the help of the town's doctor who Roy has known for years, he gets a job as a lineman, working for the power company, which supplies electricity to the mine.

The thieves tie up the mine workers and try to steal a second wagon load of uranium, but Roy gives chase and is able to get the ore away from the thieves. The thieves make a second attempt and steal the second load of ore after it had been taken to the warehouse. Roy finds out that the uranium will be delivered to a dry lake bed where a foreign government is going to land an airplane to pick up the uranium. Roy has to rush to try to stop the plane from taking off with the uranium.

Cast 
 Roy Rogers as Roy Rogers
 Trigger as Roy's Horse
 Dale Evans as Pam Reynolds
 Pat Brady as Sparrow Biffle
 Grant Withers as Craig Bennett
 Leo Cleary as Dr. Frank Harding
 Clifton Young as Ross
 Robert Bice as Jim Russell
 Stuart Randall as Sheriff
 John Hamilton as Mr. Linden, Insurance Company Official
 Edmund Cobb as Rafferty
 Eddie Lee as Shanghai, the Cook
 Rex Lease as Shipping Company Foreman
 Lane Bradford as Shipping smuggler
 Foy Willing as Foy
 Riders of the Purple Sage as Power Co. Linemen / Musicians

Production
Director William Witney remains a favorite of director Quentin Tarantino. In a New York Times interview, Tarantino spoke eloquently about Witney's prowess as a director, specifically mentioning Witney's work with Roy Rogers programmers. He detailed how Witney gradually moved Rogers into more naturalistic costumes such as jeans and flannel shirts, and how occasionally the camera would follow Rogers' horse Trigger for much of a film, going off and having adventures with other animals before returning to Rogers. Tarantino and a reporter screened Witney's Roy Rogers movie The Golden Stallion together during the aforementioned interview.

Soundtrack 
 "Save a Smile For a Rainy Day" (Written by Sid Robin and Foy Willing)
 "Got No Time For the Blues" (Written by Sid Robin and Foy Willing)
 "Bells of Coronado" (Written by Sid Robin and Foy Willing, Spanish Lyrics by Aaron González)

References

External links 
 
 
 
 
 

1950 films
1950 Western (genre) films
Republic Pictures films
American Western (genre) films
Trucolor films
Films directed by William Witney
1950s English-language films
1950s American films